Chal Bardar or Chal Bar Dar may refer to:
 Chal Bardar, Izeh
 Chal Bardar, Lali